Stenotrophomonas indicatrix is a Gram-negative, rod-shaped and none-spore-forming bacterium from the genus of Stenotrophomonas which has been isolated from the surface of a milking machine in Germany.

References 

Xanthomonadales
Bacteria described in 2018